The All Star Circuit of Champions (abbreviated ASCoC), officially known as the Tezos All Star Circuit of Champions presented by Mobil 1 for naming rights reasons, is an American motorsports sanctioning body of winged sprint car racing founded in 1970. The series sanctions 410ci sprint car races in several states. On average the series runs 50 races per year, starting February and ending in October each year. The ASCoC was purchased by Tony Stewart in the winter of 2015.

History
The ASCoC was founded by Bud Miller in 1970 after a failed venture by himself, Chris Economaki, and Wellman Lehman, to build a new race track near Youngstown, OH. Through the meetings about building the track the idea was conceived to create a touring sprint car series in the area. The idea of the All Star Circuit of Champions was then born in 1970 and began operating that year. The series would cease operations after just 3 years in 1973, when the 1973 oil crisis triggered fuel price increases and shortages.

The series would reform in 1979 with new owner, Bert Emick. Emick lost the rights to the MOSS sanctioning body in the Ohio area. He brought back the All Star name in 1980. Emick would run the series until 2002 when Guy Webb took over.

Joey Saldana set a series record with 18 wins in 1995 piloting the Art Wendt 77w.

Guy Webb took over as owner in 2002, running the series for 12 years. In January 2015, Webb sold the series to former NASCAR driver Tony Stewart.

Stewart took sole ownership of the ASCoC in 2015 after an organization called Renegade Sprints competed with Webb's group. Stewart brought the two groups back together in under the All Star banner.

In January 2016 it was announced that the series gained Arctic Cat as the series title sponsor.

The series had 29 different winners in 2017. Chad Kemenah would control the 2017 season and back up the 2016 championship with his 6th championship in 2017, tying Dale Blaney for most titles in series history. 19 different drivers won in 2018. Aaron Reutzel from Clute, TX took on the series full-time and was crowned champion after a 9 win season.

In December 2018, MAVTV announced they had acquired the rights to broadcast the highlights of select events. Starting in 2020, all races are broadcast live in full on FloSports.

Ollie's Bargain Outlet took over title sponsorship of the series beginning in 2019, sharing naming rights with Mobil 1. FloRacing became the title sponsor for the 2021 season. The following season, Tezos assumed naming rights on a three-year deal.

Champions

Notable drivers

 Dale Blaney, 137 wins, 6 championships
 Kenny Jacobs, 98 wins, 4 championships
 Joey Saldana, 74 wins
 Tim Shaffer, 58 wins, 4 championships
 Jack Hewitt, 56 wins, 1 championship
 Frankie Kerr, 53 wins, 4 championships
 Dave Blaney, 48 wins
 Bobby Allen, 46 wins, 1 championship
 Kevin Huntley, 44 wins
 Kelly Kinser, 42 wins
 Jeff Shepard, 40 wins
 Steve Kinser, 37 wins
 Doug Wolfgang, 37 wins
 Danny Lasoski, 37 wins
 Chad Kemenah, 33 wins, 6 championships
 Aaron Reutzel, 25 wins, 3 championships
 Lee Osborne, 17 wins, 3 championships

Series owners
C.H. "Bud" Miller (1970–1973)
Bert Emick (1980–2002)
Guy Webb (2002–2015)
Tony Stewart (2015–current)

References 

Sprint car racing
Auto racing organizations in the United States
Tony Stewart